Galym Baubekuly Mambetaliyev (Ğalym Baubeküly Mambetaliev; born April 4, 1965) is a former Kazakhstani professional ice hockey forward. He is currently an ice hockey coach.

Coaching career
2002-2003 CSKA Temirtau - head coach
2004-2005 Barys Astana - head coach
2006-2008 HC Saryarka - head coach
2008-2009 Kazakhstan National Ice Hockey Team - head coach
2008-2010 Barys Astana - assistant coach
2010-2011 Barys Astana-2 - head coach
2011-2012 Snezhnye Barsy - head coach
2011-2012 Kazakhstan National Ice Hockey Team - assistant coach
2011-2012 Kazakhstan National U20 Ice Hockey Team - assistant coach
2013–present Snezhnye Barsy - head coach

External links

1965 births
Living people
People from Temirtau
Kazakhstani ice hockey forwards
Avtomobilist Karagandy players
Bulat Temirtau players
Barys Astana head coaches
Kazakhstani ice hockey coaches
Soviet ice hockey forwards
Zauralie Kurgan players
Kazakhstan men's national ice hockey team coaches